Kentucky Route 670 (KY 670) is a  state highway in southern Webster County. It serves as a northern bypass around Providence, connecting KY 109 to U.S. Route 41 Alternate (US 41 Alt.).

Major intersections

References

0670
0670